Sinocoelacanthus is an extinct genus of prehistoric coelacanth that lived during the Early Triassic epoch.

See also

 Prehistoric fish
 List of prehistoric bony fish

References

Early Triassic fish
Fossils of China